Qareh Qowyunlu (also Romanized as Qareh Qowyūnlū; also known as Qareh Qoynlū) is a village in Keshavarz Rural District, Keshavarz District, Shahin Dezh County, West Azerbaijan Province, Iran. At the 2006 census, its population was 791, in 164 families.

References 

Populated places in Shahin Dezh County